Nadezhdino is a rural locality (a selo) in Kalmiyabashevsky Selsoviet, Kaltasinsky District, Bashkortostan, Russia. The population was 66 as of 2010. There are 2 streets.

Geography 
Nadezhdino is located 27 km southeast of Kaltasy (the district's administrative centre) by road. Baryaza is the nearest rural locality.

References 

Rural localities in Kaltasinsky District